Count of Olivença, was a Portuguese title of nobility created by a royal decree, on 21 July 1424, by King Afonso V of Portugal, and granted to Dom Rodrigo Afonso of Melo.

He was the sole count of this title. His daughter and heir, Dona Filipa de Melo, married Álvaro of Braganza.  From this marriage descends the House of Cadaval.

List of the Counts of Olivença 
 Rodrigo Afonso de Melo, Count of Olivença (c.1430-1487)

See also 
 List of countships in Portugal

External links 
 Genealogy of the Count of Olivença, in Portuguese

Bibliography 
 "Nobreza de Portugal e do Brasil" – Vol. III, page 78. Published by Zairol Lda., Lisbon 1989.

Countships of Portugal
1424 establishments in Portugal

pt:Conde de Olivença